Guanine nucleotide-binding protein G(i), alpha-1 subunit is a protein that in humans is encoded by the GNAI1 gene.

Interactive pathway map

Interactions 

GNAI1 has been shown to interact with:

 GPR143, 
 RGS12, 
 RGS14, 
 RGS19,
 RIC8A,  and
 S1PR1.

References

Further reading